Calliostoma hayamanum is a species of sea snail, a marine gastropod mollusk in the family Calliostomatidae.

Notes
Additional information regarding this species:
 Taxonomic remark: Some authors place this taxon in the subgenus Calliostoma (Tristichotrochus)

Description
The size of the shell varies between 35 mm and 50 mm.

Distribution
This marine species occurs off Japan.

References

 Higo, S., Callomon, P. & Goto, Y. (1999). Catalogue and bibliography of the marine shell-bearing Mollusca of Japan. Osaka. : Elle Scientific Publications. 749 pp.

External links
 To Encyclopedia of Life
 To World Register of Marine Species
 

hayamanum
Gastropods described in 1971